Conus tenuilineatus is a species of sea snail, a marine gastropod mollusc in the family Conidae, the cone snails and their allies.

Like all species within the genus Conus, these snails are predatory and venomous. They are capable of "stinging" humans, therefore live ones should be handled carefully or not at all.

Description
The size of the shell varies between 18 mm and 29 mm.

Distribution
This species occurs in the Atlantic Ocean off Angola.

References

 Rolán E. & Röckel D. 2001. The endemic Conus of Angola. 2. Description of three new species. Iberus 19(2): 57–66.

External links

 The Conus Biodiversity website
 Cone Shells – Knights of the Sea
 

Endemic fauna of Angola
tenuilineatus
Gastropods described in 2001